The 1870 United States elections occurred in the middle of Republican President Ulysses S. Grant's first term, during the Third Party System. Members of the 42nd United States Congress were chosen in this election. The election took place during the Reconstruction Era, and many Southerners were barred from voting. It was also the first election after the passage of the 15th Amendment, which prohibits state and federal governments from denying the right to vote on the basis of race, color, or previous condition of servitude, although disenfranchisement would persist. The Republican Party maintained a majority in both houses of Congress, although Democrats picked up several seats in both chambers.

In the House, Democrats won major gains, but Republicans retained a solid majority.

In the Senate, Democrats won moderate gains, but Republicans retained a commanding majority.

See also
1870–71 United States House of Representatives elections
1870–71 United States Senate elections

References

1870 elections in the United States
1870
United States midterm elections